Title 23 of the United States Code is a positive law title of the United States Code with the heading "Highways."

 —Federal-Aid Highways
 —Other Highways
 —General Provisions
 —Highway Safety
 —Research And Technology

See also
Title 23 of the Code of Federal Regulations

External links
U.S. Code Title 23, via United States Government Printing Office
U.S. Code Title 23, via Cornell University

Title 23
23